Cho Ha-La (born 21 March 1988) is a South Korean table tennis player. Her highest career ITTF ranking was 115.

References

1988 births
Living people
South Korean female table tennis players